Xu Gang (born December 1958) is a former Chinese official who spent most of his career in Fujian province. He was the vice Governor of Fujian since 2013. On March 20, 2015, Xu Gang was placed under investigation by the Communist Party's anti-corruption agency. He was the first high-ranking politician being examined from Fujian province after the 18th Party Congress in 2012. In 2016, Xu was sentenced to 13 years in prison.

Career
Xu Gang was born in Pucheng County, Fujian. In 1978, Xu Gang attended Fudan University and graduated in 1982. In 1997, he became vice-mayor of Putian until September 2000. In 2003, Xu became the director of Department of Transportation of Fujian. In 2005, he became the director of Economic and Trade Commission of Fujian. Xu Gang became the Communist Party Secretary of Quanzhou from April 2008 to February 2013. In February 2013, Xu Gang became the Vice Governor of Fujian. He managed personnel, labor and social security, work safety, food and drug safety, emergency management, petition and efficiency etc.

On March 20, 2015, Xu Gang was placed under investigation by the Central Commission for Discipline Inspection of the Chinese Communist Party for "serious violations of laws and regulations". Xu was expelled from the communist party on July 27, 2015.

On December 29, 2016, Xu was sentenced to 13 years in prison for bribery.

References

1958 births
Living people
Politicians from Nanping
Fudan University alumni
Political office-holders in Fujian
Chinese Communist Party politicians from Fujian
People's Republic of China politicians from Fujian
Expelled members of the Chinese Communist Party
Chinese politicians convicted of corruption